Papyrus Oxyrhynchus 222 (P. Oxy. 222 or P. Oxy. II 222) is a list of ancient Olympic victors by an unknown author, written in Greek. It was discovered in Oxyrhynchus. The manuscript was written on papyrus in the form of a roll. It is dated to the third century. Currently it is housed in the British Library (Department of Manuscripts, 1185) in London.

Description 
The document was written by an unknown copyist. The recto side contains a list of Olympic victors from 480–468 BC and 456–448 BC. The verso side contains an accounting of money. The measurements of the fragment are 180 by 95 mm. The text is written in a small semi-cursive hand.

It was discovered by Grenfell and Hunt in 1897 in Oxyrhynchus. The text was published by Grenfell and Hunt in 1899.

Significance
According to Grenfell and Hunt, "the number of interesting points upon which the papyrus throws new light is very considerable."

A few examples of these points are as follows:  The manuscript allowed the dating of Pindar's victory odes on the Pythian Games to be definitively confirmed at 582 BC. It also allowed the dates of three of Pindar's odes, which had previously been disputed, to be determined precisely. The papyrus also dated Pindar's First Olympian Ode and the Fifth ode of Bacchylides.

This papyrus proved that Bacchylides was alive as late as 452 BC, when the latest previously known date was 468 BC. It showed that Polykleitos and Pythagoras of Rhegium flourished in the fifth century BC. It also cleared up a long-disputed point of interpretation of a passage in Aristotle's Nicomachean Ethics (vii 4.2).

The more general value of the papyrus lies in its bearing on the wider question of the credibility of early scholiasts and commentators on matters of fact of the sort discussed in the manuscript. Because it was found at a remote and relatively unimportant center of Hellenic culture, it shows that such information was widely diffused and easily accessible throughout the Hellenic world. Given such diffusion, false statements of fact by ancient authors would have been easily detected, which makes it very unlikely that such authors would risk exposure by making things up. Thus this manuscript supports an assumption of the trustworthiness of ancient tradition as a sound principle of modern textual criticism.

See also 
 Oxyrhynchus Papyri
 Papyrus Oxyrhynchus 221
 Papyrus Oxyrhynchus 223

References 

222
3rd-century manuscripts
British Library collections